The Spice Girls are an English girl group formed in 1994. The group comprises Victoria Beckham ("Posh Spice"), Mel B ("Scary Spice"), Emma Bunton ("Baby Spice"), Melanie C ("Sporty Spice") and Geri Halliwell ("Ginger Spice").

The Spice Girls were signed to Virgin Records and released their debut single "Wannabe" in 1996; it hit number one in 37 countries and commenced their global success. Their debut album Spice was released in 1996 and sold more than 23 million copies worldwide. Their second album, Spiceworld, was released the following year and was also a commercial success, selling over 14 million copies worldwide. The group released their third and final studio album Forever in November 2000, which was also their only album without Halliwell, who left in 1998. After a hiatus of seven years, the group reunited in 2007 for a concert tour and released a greatest hits album.

Over their careers, the Spice Girls have received a number of notable awards including five Brit Awards, three American Music Awards, four Billboard Music Awards, three MTV Europe Music Awards, one MTV Video Music Award and three World Music Awards. The British Academy of Songwriters, Composers and Authors (BASCA) have also recognised the group for their songwriting achievements with two Ivor Novello Awards, while the American Society of Composers, Authors and Publishers (ASCAP) named them Songwriters of the Year at the 1997 ASCAP London Awards. In 2000, they received the Brit Award for Outstanding Contribution to Music, a Lifetime Achievement award whose previous winners include Elton John, the Beatles and Queen.

Awards and nominations

Other accolades

Notes

References

Awards
Lists of awards received by British musician
Lists of awards received by musical group